Christian Lanthaler is an Italian para-alpine skier. He represented Italy at seven Winter Paralympics: in 1992, 1994, 1998, 2002, 2006, 2010 and 2014. In total he won two silver medals in 2002: in the Men's Downhill LW2 event and in the Men's Super-G LW2 event.

He also competed in the 2011 IPC Alpine Skiing World Championships held in Sestriere, Italy but did not win a medal.

References

External links
 

Living people
Place of birth missing (living people)
Paralympic alpine skiers of Italy
Alpine skiers at the 1992 Winter Paralympics
Alpine skiers at the 1994 Winter Paralympics
Alpine skiers at the 1998 Winter Paralympics
Alpine skiers at the 2002 Winter Paralympics
Alpine skiers at the 2006 Winter Paralympics
Alpine skiers at the 2010 Winter Paralympics
Alpine skiers at the 2014 Winter Paralympics
Medalists at the 2002 Winter Paralympics
Paralympic silver medalists for Italy
Paralympic medalists in alpine skiing
1966 births
21st-century Italian people